The 2nd Academy Awards, presented by the Academy of Motion Picture Arts and Sciences (AMPAS) on April 3, 1930, at an awards banquet in the Cocoanut Grove of the Ambassador Hotel in Los Angeles, honored the best films released between August 1, 1928, and July 31, 1929. This was the first Academy Awards ceremony broadcast on radio, by local station KNX, Los Angeles.

The second ceremony included a number of changes from the first: most importantly, it was the first presentation for which the winners were not announced in advance, and the number of award categories was reduced from twelve to seven. It is unique in being the only occasion where there were no official nominees; subsequent research by AMPAS resulted in a list of unofficial or de facto nominees, based on records of which films were evaluated by the judges. Chester Morris was the first nominee for Best Actor born in the 20th century.

Mary Pickford, a founding member of AMPAS and married to its first president, lobbied to be considered for the Best Actress award, inviting the judges over for tea at her home, while other actresses being considered for the same award were not made aware of their status.

Jeanne Eagels became the first and, to date, only actress to be posthumously nominated for Best Actress, for The Letter. The Divine Lady became the last film to win Best Director without receiving a Best Picture nomination.

This is the only year in which no film won more than one Oscar. The Broadway Melody became the second of seven films to win Best Picture without a writing nomination (preceded by Wings, and followed by Grand Hotel, Cavalcade, Hamlet, The Sound of Music, and Titanic), and the first of three to win Best Picture and nothing else (followed by Grand Hotel and Mutiny on the Bounty).

Winners and nominees

Nominees were announced on October 31, 1929. Winners are listed first, highlighted in boldface and indicated with a double-dagger.

Honorary awards 

No Honorary Academy Awards  then called Special Awards  were conferred at the 2nd Academy Awards ceremony.

Multiple nominations and awards 

The following 9 films received multiple nominations:

Changes to Academy Awards 

Beginning with the 2nd Academy Awards (19281929), the following changes were made by AMPAS.

 Award categories were reduced from twelve to seven:
 The awards for Best Director (Comedy Picture) and Best Director (Dramatic Picture) were merged into a single Best Director award.
 The awards for Best Writing (Adaptation) and Best Writing (Original Story) were merged into a single Best Writing award (these would be split again for the 4th Awards.
 The awards for Best Engineering Effects, Best Unique and Artistic Production, and Best Writing (Title Writing) were discontinued.

Notable awards and nominations 
In Old Arizona and The Patriot  with five nominations each  tied the record for the film receiving the most Academy Award nominations. This record was set by 7th Heaven at the 1st Academy Awards (19271928). One year later, at the 3rd Academy Awards (19291930), the record was broken by The Love Parade, which garnered six nominations. The current record for the film receiving the most Academy Award nominations  with fourteen nominations apiece  is held by All About Eve (1950), Titanic (1997), and La La Land (2016). This record has stood for  years.

See also 
 1928 in film
 1929 in film

References 
Notes

Citations

External links 
 The Official Academy Awards Database
 FilmSite.org writeup of 1928/29 Academy Awards

1928 film awards
1929 film awards
1930 in American cinema
1930 in Los Angeles
Academy Awards ceremonies
April 1930 events